The Alum Cliffs are a section of cliffed coast facing the Derwent Estuary and Storm Bay along the suburbs of Taroona, Bonnet Hill, and Kingston Beach, Tasmania, Australia.

History
The first reference of the Alum Cliffs namesake was documented in 1847.

Geology
The Alum Cliffs are made of Permian mudstone, containing pyrite. Once oxidised, the pyrite produces the chemical compound alum.

Recreation
The Alum Cliffs track is a popular  (2.5 hour) return walking track frequented by locals and tourists. A small track was initially developed in the 1970s and formally developed as part of Australia's Bicentennial celebrations in 1988.
In 2018, a council proposal was put forward to upgrade the track to facilitate mountain biking.

Access
The Alum Cliffs track is accessible via Tyndall Beach at Kingston Beach and the Channel Highway.

References

Cliffs of Australia
Coastline of Tasmania